, is a former Japanese gymnast and singer. From 1999 to 2000, she was the leader of the girl group Taiyo to Ciscomoon and associated with Hello! Project.

Biography
Shinoda became known in Japan in the late 1980s as an elite-level gymnast, participating in the 1988 Summer Olympics in Seoul at the age of 16. She began a second career as a singer in 1999, after a televised audition by Hello! Project Taiyo to Ciscomoon, which was later called T&C Bomber. She was also a participant in the short-lived group Akagumi 4 in 2000. She quit Hello! Project after her group was eliminated at the end of 2000, and she returned to the sporting world as a women's artistic gymnastics coach. During the 2004 Summer Olympics, she provided gymnastics commentary for Japanese television.

In 2009, Shinoda rejoined the group Taiyo to Ciscomoon for a series of reunion concerts.

References

External links
 Official blog　
 Agency profile　

Gymnasts at the 1988 Summer Olympics
Olympic gymnasts of Japan
Japanese female artistic gymnasts
Japanese women pop singers
Hello! Project members
1972 births
Living people
People from Tachikawa
Gymnasts from Tokyo
20th-century Japanese women